The Edinburgh Corn Exchange is a conference, banqueting, wedding, sports and live music venue in the Chesser suburb of Edinburgh, Scotland. The maximum dinner capacity is 1,000 guests and for concerts 3,000 spectators.

History
The building was erected in 1909 as a corn exchange, and was designed by the City Superintendent of Works, James A. Williamson. It is a category B listed building. It was restored to its former glory by Marcos (a family run Edinburgh Business) and opened in 1992. It was restored for use as a venue in 1999. It was awarded with the Large venue of the year award two years in a row at the Scottish Event Awards 2011 and 2012.

The neighbouring Corn Exchange Village has facilities such as ten pin bowling, 5-a-side and 7-a-side football pitches, and a sports bar.

References

Gifford, John, McWilliam, Colin and Walker, David M	1984	Edinburgh (The Buildings of Scotland)

External links
Edinburgh Corn Exchange

Music venues in Edinburgh
Buildings and structures completed in 1909
Category B listed buildings in Edinburgh
Reportedly haunted locations in Edinburgh
Badminton in Scotland
Badminton venues